Chiton politus, the tulip chiton, is a medium-sized polyplacophoran mollusc in the family Chitonidae, found on the coast of southern Africa.

Description
The species can display a variety of shell patterns consisting of brown patches and zigzags on smooth pink valves. The central section of each valve often has a striped pattern. The girdle is covered with smooth, overlapping scales and also striped. Average adult length is 30–40 mm.

Distribution and habitat
C. politus occurs along the south coast of Africa, from Cape Columbine in Namibia to the south coast of KwaZulu-Natal in South Africa. It is quite common and can usually be found as solitary individuals under rocks near the low tide mark. The original description by Lorenz Spengler recorded it at the Cape of Good Hope.

References

Chitonidae
Molluscs of Africa
Chitons described in 1797